is a  dish of thickly-sliced, toasted bread topped with ogura jam (a common sweet spread or filling in Japan, made from red beans), served in cafés in Nagoya.

Origin
Ogura toast originated at the Mitsuba cafe in the Sakae area of Nagoya in 1921 (Taishō 10). A shopkeeper at Mitsuba noticed customers dipping their toast in zenzai (ogura porridge), and was inspired to create ogura toast in response. Afterwards, the dish spread across Aichi to become a café staple.

References

Japanese cuisine
Toast dishes